Megachile multidens is a species of bee in the family Megachilidae. It was described by Fox in 1891.

References

Multidens
Insects described in 1891